Teetwal (also spelt Tithwal) is a small border-village in Jammu and Kashmir, India. It is situated on the banks of the Kishanganga River in Kupwara district,  from the district headquarters of Kupwara and close to the Line of Control with Pakistani-administered Kashmir. Teetwal is connected to the rest of India via Tangdhar.

History
Prior to 1947 Partition of India, Teetwal used to be a commercial hub.

Geography 
Teetwal village is located in India on the Line of Control (LOC) which separates the Jammu and Kashmir administered by India from the Pakistani-administered parts of Kashmir. As per the Karachi Agreement signed by India and Pakistan in 1949, no construction is permitted within 500 yards of zero line on LOC and this "no construction zone" is considered a "no man's land" which is secured by both countries with landmines within their respective areas. India has constructed an Anti-Infiltration Obstacle System (AIOS) along the 734 km of LOC. AIOS is a three-tiered fencing system with checkposts and wire fences where villagers are given passage based on the smart card based identity cards issued by the Indian Army. Teetwal is among the villages which lie between the landmined zero point on LOC and the 3 tiers of AIOS.

Administration 
Teetwal has an elected gram panchayat for the local governance. There is a school with 400 student, an irrigation canal built with the INR2,200,000 provided by the Indian Army under the Operation Sadbhavana, and several bunkers to protect villagers from the shelling and firing by the Pakistan Military.

Demographics
According to the 2011 census of India, Teetwal has 187 households. The literacy rate of Teetwal village was 73.75% compared to 67.16% of Jammu and Kashmir. In Teetwal, Male literacy stands at 89.89% while the female literacy rate was 55.67%.

Transport

Road

Teetwal in India, is right on the Line of Control  between India and Pakistan, is connected to Tangdhar in India via the "Gundishat Bridge-Teetwal Road". NH 701 which begins at Tangdhar, provides further connectivity to other places in Jammu and Kashmir and beyond in India.

Tithwal international bridge
Tithwal bridge is one of the five crossing points along the Line of Control between India and Pakistan. It was first constructed in 1931, but was destroyed in the First Kashmir war. However, in 1988, the bridge was reconstructed jointly by India and Pakistan. This bridge connects the "Srinagar-Sopore-Tangdhar-Teetwal road" in India to the "Muzaffarabad-Nausadda-Kundal Shahi road" in Pakistan.

Rail
The nearest railway stations to Teetwal are Baramulla railway station  and Sopore railway station 116 km away, both are on Baramulla-Sopore-Srinagar-Jammu railway line and these are reachable by a 3.5 hour drive by road from Tangdhar.

Air
The nearest airport is Srinagar International Airport located at a distance of  respectively.

See also
Lolab Valley

References

Villages in Kupwara district